Haithem Dakhlaoui (born 17 November 1994) is a Tunisian freestyle wrestler. He is a two-time medalist at the African Wrestling Championships. He also represented Tunisia at the 2020 Summer Olympics in Tokyo, Japan.

Career 

He competed at the 2016 African & Oceania Wrestling Olympic Qualification Tournament hoping to qualify for the 2016 Summer Olympics in Rio de Janeiro, Brazil. He was eliminated in his second match by Jason Afrikaner of Namibia.

In 2018, he won the silver medal in the 65 kg event at the African Wrestling Championships held in Port Harcourt, Nigeria. Two years later, he secured the gold medal in the 70 kg event at the 2020 African Wrestling Championships held in Algiers, Algeria.

He qualified at the 2021 African & Oceania Wrestling Olympic Qualification Tournament to represent Tunisia at the 2020 Summer Olympics in Tokyo, Japan. He competed in the men's 65 kg event.

Major results

References

External links 
 
 
 

1994 births
Living people
Place of birth missing (living people)
Tunisian male sport wrestlers
African Wrestling Championships medalists
Wrestlers at the 2020 Summer Olympics
Olympic wrestlers of Tunisia
21st-century Tunisian people